Hiroshi Ono (born 23 March 1950) is a Japanese weightlifter. He competed in the men's bantamweight event at the 1972 Summer Olympics.

References

External links
 

1950 births
Living people
Japanese male weightlifters
Olympic weightlifters of Japan
Weightlifters at the 1972 Summer Olympics
Place of birth missing (living people)
World Weightlifting Championships medalists
20th-century Japanese people
21st-century Japanese people